Brenda Wineapple is an American nonfiction writer, literary critic, and essayist who has written several books on nineteenth-century American writers.

Biography 
Born in Boston, Massachusetts, she graduated from Brandeis University.

In 2014, Wineapple received an Literature Award in Literature from the American Academy of Arts and Letters, and her book White Heat: The Friendship of Emily Dickinson and Thomas Wentworth Higginson was a finalist for a National Book Critics Circle Award. She has received a Guggenheim fellowship, a Pushcart Prize, a fellowship from the American Council of Learned Societies, and three National Endowment for the Humanities fellowships. Elected a Fellow of the Society of American Historians and the American Academy of Arts and Sciences, she is also an elected Fellow of the New York Institute for the Humanities at NYU and was the Donald C. Gallup Fellow at the Beinecke Library, Yale University, as well as a fellow of the Indiana Institute of Arts and Letters. She serves as literary advisor for the Guggenheim Foundation and the Library of America, and she is on the advisor board of Lapham's Quarterly and The American Scholar.

Wineapple teaches in the MFA programs at Columbia University's School of the Arts and at the New School in New York City.  She was previously the Director of the Leon Levy Center for Biography at The Graduate School, CUNY, and its Writer-in-Residence. She has also taught at Sarah Lawrence College and Union College in Schenectady, NY and in the summer MFA program of Johns Hopkins University in Florence, Italy.

A regular contributor to The New York Times Book Review, The Nation and other national publications, she is also the editor of The Selected Poetry of John Greenleaf Whittier (a volume in the Library of America's American Poets Project) and Nineteenth-Century American Writers on Writing (a volume in The Writers' World, edited by Edward Hirsch).

She is married to the composer Michael Dellaira.

Works 

 Genêt: A Biography of Janet Flanner. New York : Ticknor & Fields, 1989. It is the first and only biography of the woman who wrote "The Paris Letter" for The New Yorker for fifty years, since its founding in 1925.
 Sister Brother: Gertrude and Leo Stein. Putnam's, 1996; University of Nebraska, 1997. It is a dual biography of the relationship between Gertrude Stein and her brother Leo Stein, whose collection of modern art was unparalleled and whose salon in Paris was the celebrated gathering place of writers and artists.
Hawthorne: A Life. Knopf, 2003; Random House, 2004. 
 White Heat: The Friendship of Emily Dickinson and Thomas Wentworth Higginson. Knopf, 2008. It was a finalist for the National Book Critics Circle Award, a winner of the Marfield Prize for Arts Writing, and a New York Times "Notable Book". It was named one of the Best Books of 2008 by The Times Literary Supplement, The Washington Post, The Economist, The Christian Science Monitor, The Providence Journal, and The Kansas City Star, among other publications.
 Ecstatic Nation: Confidence, Crisis, and Compromise, 1848–1877. Harper, 2013. It was named a New York Times "Notable Book". It was also listed as one of the best nonfiction books in 2013 by Kirkus Reviews and Bookpage and received a Publishers Weekly starred "Review of the Week".
 The Impeachers: The Trial of Andrew Johnson and the Dream of a Just Nation. Random, 2019.  It received a starred review from Publishers Weekly.

References

External links 
 brendawineapple.com
 "The Scarlet Letter and Nathaniel Hawthorne's America" by Brenda Wineapple
 "Up Front: Brenda Wineapple", The New York Times Book Review

 "Emily's Tryst", Review of White Heat by Miranda Seymour, The New York Times, August 22, 2008.
 Interview on White Heat at the Pritzker Military Museum & Library on February 20, 2009
 "Eccentric Nation: PW Talks with Brenda Wineapple", Publishers Weekly, June 14, 2013

Year of birth missing (living people)
City University of New York faculty
Columbia University faculty
Living people
American women essayists
American literary critics
Women literary critics
Fellows of the American Academy of Arts and Sciences
Brandeis University alumni
University of Wisconsin–Madison alumni
20th-century American essayists
20th-century American women writers
21st-century American essayists
21st-century American women writers
Writers from Boston
American women critics